The GWR 5700 Class, or 57xx class, is a class of 0-6-0 pannier tank steam locomotive built by the Great Western Railway (GWR) and British Railways (BR) between 1929 and 1950. With 863 built, they were the most prolific class of the GWR, and one of the most numerous classes of British steam locomotive.

Although officially designated by GWR as "light goods and shunting engines", they were also used for passenger working on branch, suburban, and shorter mainline journeys.

They were distributed across most of the GWR network and, after nationalisation of the railways in 1948, across the Western Region of British Railways, and also other regions.

The 5700s were not as large as the GWR Castles and Kings, but became just as much of an icon of the GWR due to their iconic design and quantity.

As a result of the 1955 Modernisation Plan, the 5700 Class was withdrawn from BR service between 1956 and 1966. Nineteen withdrawn locomotives were sold to the London Transport Executive and industry, of which ten were later preserved, along with six that were retrieved from scrapyards.

Background 
The GWR started designing and building 0-6-0 tank locomotives in 1860, and this continued into the BR era until 1956, with a total of 2,393 being built. The GWR also used 0-6-0 tank locomotives from other manufacturers' designs (from its subsidiary and absorbed railways' stock), and since 1898 it always had at least 1,000 tank locomotives in stock.

The early 0-6-0 tank engines were fitted with either saddle tanks (wrapped over the boiler) or side tanks (mounted at the side of the boiler and reaching down to the running platform). GWR first fitted pannier tanks (mounted on the side of the boiler but not reaching down to the running platform) in 1898 to nine 4-4-0 tank locomotives and, in 1901, to five 0-6-0T locomotives which were also fitted with Belpaire fireboxes. The shape of the Belpaire firebox gives a larger surface area which improves heat transfer and steam production, but their rectangular shape made them difficult to combine with saddle tanks. Locomotives fitted with pannier tanks have a lower centre of gravity than those with saddle tanks (enabling higher speeds on curves), and access for maintenance is easier than for those fitted with side tanks.

George Jackson Churchward's period as Chief Mechanical Engineer from 1901 to 1921 is well known for significant improvements in locomotive design and manufacture, and the development of standard designs. However, the scope of the standard designs did not include the 0-6-0 tank locomotive, and the GWR did not introduce any new 0-6-0 tank designs from 1897 to 1928 (with exception of the 1361 Class of five 0-6-0 saddle tanks in 1910).

However, pannier tanks and Belpaire fireboxes became the standard for the rebuilding of various 0-6-0 tank locomotives (projected in 1902 and getting fully underway by 1910). The rebuilding program also included a number of other changes including:
 improved cab designs, eventually becoming fully enclosed
 superheating, which by 1929, had been found to have little benefit on shunting engines 
 adaptation for working with autocoaches for push–pull trains (auto-working)

With the completion of grouping in 1923, GWR's collection of 0-6-0 tank locomotives was expanded with the stock from 28 acquired companies. The acquired tank locomotives came from different manufacturers, were a mixture of side, saddle and pannier, and varied widely by size and state of repair. In addition, GWR's stock was wearing out, and the variety of classes was problematic for maintenance and rostering. Collett had to produce a new standard design for 0-6-0 pannier tanks, which resulted in the 5700 Class.

Design

The first batch of 300 locomotives built between 1929 and 1931 included a medium height chimney, a mid-boiler dome, safety valve with cover, and an enclosed cab. They were similar in appearance to older 0-6-0 tank engines that had been rebuilt as pannier tanks, particularly the later rebuilds of the 2721 Class. The 2721 Class was itself a development of the 1854 Class, which in turn was based on the 645 Class.

Specification

The table below gives the technical specifications of the 5700 class. Values are from GWR diagram B48 unless referenced otherwise.

The 5700s were given the GWR route colour Blue (based on axle load), and were in the GWR power group C (based on tractive effort). The classifications were shown on the cab with the letter C in a blue disc.

le Fleming describes the 5700 class as "an almost unaltered continuation of the 27xx rebuilds" and Holcroft describes them as "practically identical to 2721 rebuilds", but according to Oswald Nock it was "a thoroughly modern design", and Jones notes that design included "numerous detailed improvements" and reflected improved construction techniques. The main differences from the 2721 class include:

improved valve settings
fully enclosed cab

The initial design also included a return to non-fluted coupling rods and laminated springs beneath the leading and driving axleboxes (both features harking back to the 1854 class). The locomotives were also fitted with cast iron chimneys (which had only rarely been fitted to earlier locomotives), and the whistles were fitted on top of the firebox rather than on top of the cab.

6700 Sub-class

Of the first batch of 300 locomotives, most were fitted with vacuum brakes and steam heating, and some of these were also fitted with GWR's Automatic Train Control (ATC) safety system.

However, the 50 locomotives of the 6700 or 67xx Class were not fitted with vacuum brakes, steam heating, or ATC, and were fitted with three link couplings only; they were therefore limited to shunting duties and some freight working.

8750 Sub-class

The 8750 or 87xx Class were first built in 1933, using an updated design which included an improved cab with a higher roof, rectangular windows and grills (as opposed to the round windows (or "spectacles") of the initial design), and sliding shutters and hinged doors for more protection from the elements. The new style cab was derived from the sister 5400 Class, the first of which were built in 1931. Vacuum brakes, steam heating, and ATC were fitted as standard (except for Nos. 6750–79, built between 1946 and 1950, which were fitted with steam brakes and three link couplings only).

9700 Class 

The 9700 or 97xx Class pannier tanks were a direct development of the 5700 class. The prototype for the class, No. 8700 (later No. 9700), was a rebuilt 5700 locomotive. They were specifically for working on the Hammersmith & City line between Paddington station and Smithfield Meat Market. They replaced Metro and 633 class locomotives.

The eleven locomotives in the class had a condensing apparatus that fed the exhaust steam back into the water tanks. The tanks themselves were shortened to make room for the external exhaust pipes and were extended down to the footplate in front of the cab to increase their capacity. As condensing the steam heated the water, a reciprocating pump (Weir pump) was fitted as a boiler feedwater pump because standard injectors will not work with hot water. The pumps led to (unsuccessful) tests with these locomotives acting as fire engines during World War II.

To work over the electrified underground lines, the 9700 Class locomotives had a special type of ATC equipment that lifted clear of the centre rail and had tripcock brake valves that matched the London Transport signalling system. The design changes resulted in reduced coal capacity and a slight increase in water capacity.

Later developments

From 1936 to 1942, a number of small changes were introduced to new builds:

In 1936, a whistle shield was added to the front of the cab to deflect steam away from the cab windows.
Also in 1936, pocket steps and extra railings were added to the fireman's side (left side) of the cab to improve access to the bunker.
In 1937, a drawing was issued for fitting shutters and doors to the older, pre-8750 class, locomotives.
In 1938, a larger whistle shield was fitted, which became standard for the larger cabs.
In 1942, a new type of top feed was introduced, with separate clackboxes in a taller cover, and internal delivery pipes rather than trays.

All these changes (with the exception of the new top feed) were later applied to locomotives that had been built earlier. The new top feed became standard for new locomotives in 1944. Some older boilers and locomotives were later fitted with the new top feed, and some locomotives that were built with the new top feed were later changed back to the old design as boilers were swapped.

Variants

A small number of 5700s were adapted for specific tasks:

From 1937 to the end of World War II, thirteen 5700s were fitted with spark arresting chimneys for work on industrial and military sites with significant fire risks.
In 1958, No. 3711 was converted to oil burning by Robert Stephenson and Hawthorns.
In 1946, No. 7722 was fitted with winding gear to work the Pwllyrhebog Colliery incline on the former Taff Vale Railway.

Production 

The first 5700s were built in 1929 by North British Locomotive Co. and, later in the year, at GWR's Swindon Works. Between 1929 and 1931 a total of 300 were built, of which 50 were built by GWR, and the rest by outside contractors:

 Armstrong Whitworth: 25 (Nos. 7775–99)
 W. G. Bagnall: 50 (Nos. 6700–24, 8725–49)
 Beyer, Peacock & Co: 25  (Nos. 8700–24)
 Kerr Stuart: 25 (Nos. 7700–24)
 North British: 100 (Nos. 5700–49, 7725–74)
 Yorkshire Engine Co: 25 (Nos. 6725–49)

It was unusual, but not unprecedented, for GWR to use outside contractors to build locomotives, as 50 of the 200 strong 5600 Class had been built by Armstrong Whitworth. The building programme was partly funded by interest-free government loans intended to relieve unemployment during the Great Depression. Also, stricter accountancy rules that distinguished between maintenance and building costs meant that it was often economically worthwhile to build new locomotives rather than repair older locomotives.

At first more 5700s were built than were immediately needed, so Nos. 6700–49 were stored for a couple of years before being allocated. Many of these were then assigned to sheds near the South Wales ports of Newport, Barry, Cardiff and Swansea.

After a gap of a year, building started again in 1933, with the 8750 and 9700 classes, and continued until 1950. All the later locomotives, totalling 563, were built at Swindon, and the numbers built only dropped in the last few years with the introduction of the 9400 class in 1947.

Numbers built

A total of 863 5700s were built and the table below shows the number built by year.

Build details

The 5700s were specified by 27 different order numbers, or lots, shown below.

Costs

Some known costs (either GWR's out-shop value or cost from contractors) are shown below, along with estimated equivalent values for 2013.

Numbering and liveries 
The size of the class demanded that the 5700 class locomotives were spread across several series of numbers.

The different series started in the following chronological order; 57xx (1929), 77xx (1929), 67xx (1930), 87xx (1931), 97xx (1933), 37xx (1936), 36xx (1938), 46xx (1941), and 96xx (1945). GWR locomotives were not renumbered after nationalisation, but a W (for Western Region) was temporarily added to some locomotives.

The first 5700s built were painted in the standard GWR livery of the time; mainly green above the running plate with the words "GREAT WESTERN" painted in yellow letters with red and black shadowing on the side of the pannier tanks, buffer beams painted red with the number shown in yellow letters with black shadowing, and the front of the smokebox and chimney were black. From 1934 the GWR "shirtbutton" roundel replaced "GREAT WESTERN". From 1942 GWR replaced the roundel with the letters "G W R", in yellow letters with red and black shading. Due to wartime shortages, most locomotives (apart from the Kings and Castles) were painted black from 1942 to 1945.

After nationalisation, some 5700s were painted in BR green with the words "BRITISH RAILWAYS" on the side of the pannier tanks, but unlined black soon became the standard for tank locomotives, with the BR crest on the sides of the pannier tanks. Some 5700s also had white and red lining on the pannier tanks and cab sides. The BR crest was changed in 1957.

The 5700s bought by London Transport between 1956 and 1963 were repainted in the standard LT maroon livery with yellow and black lining. Those bought by NCB were painted in a light green.

Operation

The 5700s were used on GWR for various duties including shunting, pilot work, and light to medium goods. They were also used on branch, commuter and shorter mainline passenger trains. They were also used on standby for more powerful locomotives, sometimes producing "firework displays" as they strived to keep to the schedule with heavier loads.

The 5700s were never fitted remote control gear for working autotrains. This was left to smaller pannier locomotives that followed; the 5400 Class (introduced in 1930) and the 6400 Class (introduced in 1932).

The 9700s (fitted with condensing equipment for underground working) and built specifically for working the line between Paddington and Smithfield, were allocated to Old Oak Common.

The 6700s (built for shunting only and kept in storage for a couple of years because of a lack of suitable work) eventually found their niche working the marshalling yards between the South Wales coalfields and the coal exporting docks of Llanelli, Swansea, Cardiff, Barry and Newport. Some were allocated to just one shed for their entire working life (Nos. 6700–9 at Cardiff East Dock and Nos. 6725–32 at Newport, Pill). A number of 6700s were also allocated to Swindon, with 6733–41 spending a long time there.

Thirteen 5700s were fitted with spark arresting chimneys for working in industrial and military systems and sidings, particularly the War Department ammunition dump at Milton, near Didcot during World War II.

The Pwllyrhebog Colliery incline on the former Taff Vale Railway was a  1-in-13 incline with a continuous rope cable so that a descending train was partially counterbalanced by an ascending train. The locomotives (Taff Vale Railway H class) on the incline were fitted with coned boilers so that there was always sufficient water above the firebox. To provide additional control and power a stationary locomotive, fitted with two intergeared drums, controlled the cable. No. 2750 Class 2721 had been fitted with the necessary winding gear to control the incline in 1935, but was withdrawn in 1945, and replaced by 5700 No. 7722 which was fitted with the winding gear in 1946. Operation of the incline ended in 1952.

Allocation

The 5700s' route classification (Blue) meant that they were allowed on approximately 70% of the GWR network. By 1938 only 15 (out of approximately 70) running sheds did not have any 5700s allocated.

In 1950, the route classification was changed to Yellow because of the 5700s' low hammer blow. The change did not apply to Nos. 9700–10. This meant that 5700s were now allowed on almost 90% of the old GWR network (roughly equivalent to the new Western Region of British Rail). By 1954, only five running sheds (Abercynon, Aberystwyth, Machynlleth, Treherbert and Truro) did not have any 5700s allocated.

BR working
In the early years of British Railways, the boundaries between the Western and the Southern Region changed a number of times. 5700s took up new duties in a variety of places:
At Weymouth, 5700s operated the branch line to the Isle of Portland (replacing LSWR O2 class 0-4-4T locomotives). They were also seen pulling boat trains through the streets of Weymouth.
Six 5700s were allocated to Nine Elms and worked empty stock between Waterloo and Clapham Junction (replacing LSWR M7 class 0-4-4T locomotives).
The short Folkestone Harbour branch line from Folkestone Harbour station to Folkestone Junction was always problematic when hauling heavy boat trains up the 1-in-36 incline. Six 5700s were allocated to Dover for working (including banking) on the branch (replacing SER R1 class 0-6-0T locomotives).

The last scheduled passenger trains hauled by 5700s on BR were on seen London Midland Region on the Wrexham to New Brighton route (passing over old LNER territory). The Wrexham to Seacombe service ended at the beginning of 1960 but was immediately replaced by a DMU service between Wrexham and New Brighton. The service on Bank Holidays was so popular that demand outstripped available DMUs, and a relief train of four coaches pulled by No. 3749 was laid on. Two more 5700s were used over the Spring Bank Holiday that year, but from then BR Standard Class 4 2-6-4T locomotives usually handled the relief services. In 1965, 5700s were used for the last time on Whit Monday and August Bank Holiday relief services.

The 5700s were the last steam locomotives used on Western Region. The last working locomotives were allocated to Croes Newydd, and were working goods trains and shunting until November 1966. By the end of the steam era, the record keeping of allocations and working of local steam locomotives was rather lax, and it was not unknown for locomotives to be used after being officially withdrawn. For many years Nos. 4646, 4696, and 9774 were thought to be the last ex-GWR locomotives to work on British Rail, but No. 9641 was also still in steam at Croes Newydd at the same time.

5700s at work

Accidents and incidents
On 26 August 1940, a bombing raid destroyed a goods shed at Bordesley, West Midlands. During the raid Peter Smout, an 18-year-old engine cleaner who was acting as the fireman on a shunter, volunteered to drive No. 7758 to pull wagons out of the blazing goods shed. He made three more trips. He was assisted by Frederick Blake, a wagon examiner and a navy veteran from World War I, who operated the points levers. When they finished, the right hand side of the footplate was too hot to touch, and Blake had to use his hat to work the points as the levers were also too hot to touch. Both men were awarded the George Medal for their courage.
On 7 December 1961, a locomotive of the class was in collision with a freight train at Bodmin General station, Cornwall due to a faulty signal failing to give a clear danger aspect.

Other pannier tank locomotives 
There were numerous other classes of pannier tanks built by the GWR. The majority belonged to two "families" of "large" and "small" designs. Others included absorbed stock, more specialised types and conversions of tender locos. The two main groups were:

 A "large" group originally featuring saddle tanks (or in a few cases side tanks), 4 ft 6 in driving wheels and double frames e.g. 1076 Class or inside frames GWR 645 Class, culminating in the 9400 Class.
 A "small" group originally built at Wolverhampton Works with saddle tanks and driving wheels of 4 ft commencing with the GWR 850 Class and culminating in the 1600 Class

For example, within the "small" group, the GWR 5400 Class locomotives were derived from the William Dean-designed GWR 2021 Class (an enlargement of the 850 Class), with larger wheels for higher top speed and fitted with autotrain apparatus ('auto-fitted') for push-pull passenger work. The GWR 6400 Class were similar to the 5400 Class, also being auto-fitted, but having the same size wheels as the 5700. The GWR 7400 Class were very similar to the 6400 Class, but were not auto-fitted and had a higher boiler pressure.

Within the "large" group, the GWR 9400 Class was the post-war updated design of the 8750 variant of the 57xx: heavier and longer, but nominally no more powerful, using the same taper boiler as the GWR 2251 Class.

For a list of classes, see GWR 0-6-0PT.

Withdrawal and mileages 

After the 1955 Modernisation Plan, the reduction in branch line work and the introduction of diesel shunters, the Western Region embarked on a dieselisation programme which, along with a reduction in branch line work, reduced the demand for the services of the 5700s.
Withdrawal from service with BR started in 1956 and was completed in 1966.

Twenty locomotives were sold and continued in use until 1971 by the London Transport and 1975 by the National Coal Board.

le Fleming noted that the mileages of those withdrawn between March 1956 and March 1958 ranged "between 500,000 and 556,000". Some other known mileages are shown below.

Use after British Railways 

Nineteen 5700s were sold for further use after being withdrawn by British Railways. The National Coal Board (NCB) bought five, one was bought by P.D. Fuels, and thirteen were bought by London Transport.

One more locomotive, No. 9642, was withdrawn in 1964 and sold to Hayes Scrapyard. It was used for three years to shunt other locomotives being scrapped, and was later saved for preservation.

London Transport 

Although the London Underground network had been electrified for many years (the then Metropolitan Railway was electrified in 1905) a small number of steam locomotives were retained for engineering and ballast trains. By the 1950s, the locomotives were past their prime and expensive to maintain, and the planned quadrupling of part of the Metropolitan line would require reliable locomotives. London Transport considered replacing the steam fleet with diesel shunters, and had also tested (unsuccessfully) a Great Northern Railway Class J52 locomotive in 1955.

The first 5700 locomotive, No. 7711, underwent trials from January to April 1956, first running between Finchley Road and Baker Street. Modifications were needed to the cab for clearance and the tripcock brake valves after problems were found when running in reverse. Curtains were also fitted to the cab to reduce smoke and fumes in tunnels. In May, the 5700s became the standard for engineering trains on London Transport when they bought No. 7711 (for £3,160), decided to buy another (No. 5752), and planned to buy more over the coming years.

Thirteen 5700s were bought by London Transport (from 1956 to 1963). They were numbered L89 to L99 and were allocated to the depots at Lillie Bridge (Fulham) and Neasden. Only eleven were running at any one time, the original L90 and L91 were withdrawn for repairs but scrapped instead and replaced by other locomotives which carried the same number.

They worked permanent way trains and were never used on normal passenger services. Main line running included trips between depots, to Acton Works and runs out to Croxley Tip, near Watford.

Three of the LT 5700s lasted until the end of steam on London Transport in 1971 and were the last steam locomotives used for regular mainline working in the UK. London Transport commemorated the end of operating steam locomotives with a special run from Moorgate station to Neasden depot. The train comprised No. L94 (No. 7752) and a selection of maintenance rolling stock.
Three diesel-hydraulic locomotives were bought to carry out the shunting duties from then on.

National Coal Board 

Between 1959 and 1965, the National Coal Board (NCB) bought five 5700s from BR for use at pits in South Wales, continuing a tradition of the GWR selling withdrawn pannier tank locomotives to the NCB. The engines retained their BR numbers. The NCB locomotives did not receive maintenance to match GWR standards and were run into the ground, saving the cost of expensive overhauls.

One of the NCB 5700s, No. 7754, was the last in industrial service, and after working at various collieries was moved to Deep Duffryn Colliery at Mountain Ash in 1970, where an ex-GWR fitter kept it working until 1975 when a loose piston resulted in a blown cylinder cover. No. 7754 could still be seen on shed in 1980. The NCB donated No. 7754 to the National Museum Wales, who placed it on permanent loan to the Llangollen Railway. It is now owned by the Llangollen Railway Trust.

Other uses 

No. 3650 was withdrawn in 1963 and then sold to P.D. Fuels, a division of Stephenson Clarke Ltd., and was used to move spoil to slag heaps at Gwaen-Caer-Gurwen colliery near Ammanford, Carmarthenshire. It was later bought and restored by members of the Great Western Society and became operational in 2009.

No. 9642 was withdrawn in 1964 and sent to Hayes Scrapyard, near Bridgend. Rather than being scrapped, it was used to shunt other locomotives being scrapped. It was due for disposal in 1967, making it the 346th locomotive to be scrapped there, but due to a last minute intervention the locomotive was bought in 1968 and restored by the South Wales Pannier Group, becoming the first member of the class to be preserved. It was moved to Maesteg Colliery, where it gave break van rides from the late 1960s and throughout the 1970s.

Preservation 

Sixteen 5700 class locomotives have been preserved of which one half are from the original 5700 Class and the other half are members of the 8750 sub-class. 11 are Swindon built classmembers with the remaining five being from outside contractors. Of the sixteen engines, five are currently operational. Four of the class have worked mainline trains: 7715, 7752, 7760 and 9600. As of 2020, none of the engines are mainline certified: 7715, 7752, 7760 and 9600 are stored out of service awaiting overhauls. Two locomotives are on static display, and two are in store. Six locomotives are undergoing, or waiting for, maintenance. One locomotive, No. 9629, is being restored, and has not been in steam since it was sent to Barry Scrapyard in 1965.

A number of those bought from London Transport, which had been maintained by British Railways, were still in running order and were used on heritage railways with minimal work. No. 5764 (LT L95) was steamed the day it arrived at Bridgnorth on the Severn Valley Railway, being lit-up before it had been removed from the low-loader on which it was delivered. As of June 2018, Nos. 7752 (LT L94) and 5786 (LT L92) can be seen running in the maroon livery of London Transport, but No. 7715 (LT L99) is currently out of service.

The locomotives that were preserved after NCB and industrial use required rather more work than those acquired from London Transport. Some had been laid up for sometime after being withdrawn, and had received very little, if any, maintenance.

Of the twelve 5700s that went to Barry Scrapyard, five were saved for preservation and one (No. 3612) was bought for spares by the Severn Valley Railway.

Liveries 
The GWR 5700 class locomotives have been in a number of liveries throughout preservation and their working lives.

In fiction

No. 5775 on the Keighley and Worth Valley Railway featured in the film The Railway Children painted brown and lettered with GN&SR (Great Northern and Southern Railway). In May 2014, No. 5775 was moved to National Railway Museum Shildon, for cosmetic restoration back to the livery used in the film.

Duck the Great Western Engine in The Railway Series books by the Rev. W Awdry and the TV series Thomas the Tank Engine and Friends is a 5700 Class pannier tank. In the books, his number was No. 5741 (However, it was stated that his number was probably not his original).

No. 5764 appeared several times in the 1976 BBC television adaptation of Charles Dickens' short ghost story, The Signal-Man.

Model railways
Mainline Railways had OO gauge Class 5700 models in their catalogue in 1982–3, with models in GWR green and BR black. Bachmann Branchline has made OO gauge models of the 5700 and 8750 classes in various GWR and BR liveries, and also in the liveries of LT, NCB, Stephenson Clarke, and even GNSR (the fictional railway company in The Railway Children). Hornby produced various OO gauge models of the 8750 class in GWR and LT liveries.

Graham Farish has made British N gauge models of the 5700 and 8750 classes in various GWR and BR liveries. Dapol make British N gauge models of the 5700 and 8750 classes in various GWR and BR liveries.

Just Like The Real Thing make an O gauge kit for the 5700 and 8750 classes. Dapol since their merger with Lionheart Models in August 2016  are planning on producing models of the 57xx class in O gauge in 2017–2018. Minerva models has also released 0 gauge models of the 57xx in Great Western and British railway liveries.

Aster Hobbies produced a gauge 1 live steam 5700 Pannier tank in several GWR liverys, BR black, BR green and London Transport.  Although the LT shade of red is totally wrong, using signal red instead of the Crimson red, however it is still eye catching in the bright red.

See also 
 GWR 0-6-0PT – list of classes of GWR 0-6-0 pannier tank, including table of preserved locomotives
 LMS Fowler Class 3F – the London, Midland and Scottish Railway's standard shunter
 LNER Class J50 – the London and North Eastern Railway's standard shunter
 Hunslet Austerity 0-6-0ST – the War Department's standard shunter
 British Rail Class 08 – BR's standard shunter in the 1950s and 1960s

Notes

References

Further reading

External links 

 5700 Tank Class Introduction
 Guide to GWR Pannier Tank Classes
 Steam Locos in Profile – The GWR 5700 Pannier Tanks – a 15-minute YouTube documentary
 No. 3650 in action at Didcot Railway - includes footage taken in the cab and of the motion (7 minutes)

5700
0-6-0PT locomotives
Armstrong Whitworth locomotives
Bagnall locomotives
Beyer, Peacock locomotives
Kerr Stuart locomotives
NBL locomotives
YEC locomotives
Railway locomotives introduced in 1929
Standard gauge steam locomotives of Great Britain